the Green Buffaloes Ladies FC, commonly referred to as Green Buffaloes is a Zambian Army-sponsored women's football club based in Lusaka, Zambia.
It's the women's football section of Green Buffaloes F.C. and it competes in the FAZ Women Super division, the top tier of Zambian women football.
Domestically, Green Buffaloes has won a record 12 trophies: 7 Lusaka League, 5 National Championship. Green Buffaloes wrote history on 13 August 2022. being the first team from Zambia to qualify to the 2022 CAF Women's Champions League and by winning 2022 Hollywoodbets COSAFA Women's Champions League after beating COSAFA holders and 2021 CAF Women Champions League title winners Mamelodi Sundowns.
Green Buffaloes play its home games at Arakan Barracks Ground.

History
The Green Buffaloes were the first and only team to qualify for the COSAFA Women's Champions League from Zambia to date. having qualified as the country representative for both editions (2021 CAF Women's Champions League COSAFA Qualifiers, 2022 CAF Women's Champions League COSAFA Qualifiers), finishing as a semi-finalist in the inaugural edition. and winning the title in 2022.
Green Buffaloes will participate in their first CAF Women's Champions League. being drawn in Group A where they will face the Host AS FAR, and CECAFA and WAFU zone A regional winners.

Players

Current squad

Current technical staff

Honours

Domestic 
Lusaka League (7, record):  2011, 2013, 2015, 2016, 2017, 2018, 2019
National Championship (5, record):  2016, 2018, 2019, 2021, 2022

International 
COSAFA Women's Champions League (1): 2022

See also 
 Green Buffaloes F.C.
 FAZ Women Super division
 COSAFA Women's Champions League

References

External links 
 
 Team Info on GlobalSportsArchive

Football clubs in Africa
Football clubs in Zambia
Women's sport in Zambia